Louisa Claire Lytton (born 7 February 1989) is an English actress. She is known for her roles as Ruby Allen in EastEnders and Beth Green in The Bill. She also finished fourth in the fourth series of Strictly Come Dancing in 2006 and represented the UK at the Eurovision Dance Contest 2008, finishing ninth. Her theatre credits include playing Betty Rizzo in the 2017 UK touring production of the musical Grease.

Early life
Born on 7 February 1989 in the London Borough of Camden, Lytton attended the Sylvia Young Theatre School in Marylebone, London. She is of Italian descent on her mother's side and her first cousin once removed is Lisa Maffia, a member of the So Solid Crew.

Career

EastEnders

Lytton made her first appearance in EastEnders on 18 March 2005, playing Johnny Allen's daughter Ruby Allen. In July 2006, weeks after winning the "Sexiest Female" award at the British Soap Awards, it was announced that Lytton would be leaving EastEnders in November 2006. On the exit of her character, Lytton had commented: "I've really enjoyed my time at EastEnders. It has been a great experience which I will never forget but I am now looking forward to trying new things and not getting typecast." Lytton's final scenes were broadcast in November 2006. On 1 December 2006, Lytton appeared on the ITV1 show Loose Women and confirmed that leaving EastEnders was not her decision. In August 2008 she stated she would like to return to EastEnders once she had left The Bill. 

On 18 July 2018, Lytton was announced to be reprising her role as Ruby. Lytton revealed that she was shocked to be asked back to EastEnders after such a long time, and told Metro UK, "In my head, obviously I’d always have loved to go back to the show because it was where I started out, but it had been so long that it was never an option in my head anymore [...] I genuinely never thought about it being an option, especially because my dad had died in the show."

After a twelve-year hiatus, Ruby returned on 18 September 2018. Producers soon placed her at the centre of a sexual consent storyline, involving a special episode about the views surrounding consent. Lytton was nominated for two Digital Spy Reader Awards for the consent storyline, while Lytton and the storyline were praised by viewers and critics alike. 

Lytton left the serial for the second time in late 2021, following the birth of her first child. In March 2022, Lytton admitted she may never return to the soap.

Strictly Come Dancing

In late 2006, Lytton took part in the fourth series of the popular BBC One reality television programme Strictly Come Dancing. Aged 17 at the time, she is the youngest ever  contestant to have appeared on the show. Louisa's professional dance partner was Vincent Simone. After several impressive performances she was eliminated in the quarter-finals, finishing in fourth place out of fourteen, losing out to Emma Bunton in the viewer vote for a place in the last three. Despite this, Lytton appeared in the Christmas Special on Christmas Day with fellow contestants Mark Ramprakash, Matt Dawson and Emma Bunton, along with 2005's finalists Zoë Ball and Colin Jackson. This show was won by Jackson. Below is a scoring recap from start to finish.

Lytton began touring with 'Strictly' on 18 January 2008 with ex-EastEnders co-stars, Letitia Dean and Matt Di Angelo, and ended the tour with 11 wins under her belt. Along with her EastEnders co-star Christopher Parker, Louisa was vocal in her criticism of the media treatment of John Sergeant, which led to him resigning from the 2008 series of 'Strictly Come Dancing'.  She said she was surprised that Arlene Philips was removed as a judge from the next series of Strictly Come Dancing due to her age and she was replaced by former contestant and 2007 winner Alesha Dixon.

Strictly on Tour 2008
She was one of the former Strictly Come Dancing participants to be asked to return for Strictly on Tour which took place in early 2008 and toured the country. She was asked to return due to her personality and popularity with the audience on Strictly Come Dancing.
“I absolutely loved taking part in Strictly Come Dancing and jumped at the chance to take part in the live show, and thanks to my bosses at The Bill I've got the chance to get back out there and this time, fingers crossed, win it for the girls!". She won numerous times. She appeared on BBC Breakfast for a second time in January 2008 and a third time in September 2008.

Children in Need: Strictly Special 2019
In October 2019, it was confirmed that Lytton would return to Strictly Come Dancing for a Children in Need special with EastEnders co-stars Maisie Smith, Rudolph Walker and Ricky Champ. It was announced that she would be partnered with Gorka Márquez. On an Instagram post, Lytton revealed that she had remembered nothing about dancing from when she took part in the show, 13 years previously.

Other work
Lytton was Emma Watson's double in the film Harry Potter and the Chamber of Secrets.

Between leaving EastEnders and joining The Bill she made an appearance on the CBBC show Hider in the House as herself. She has appeared on The Paul O'Grady Show to promote her role in The Bill. She also appeared on Big Brother's Little Brother with Dermot O'Leary. On 26 June 2007 she made a second appearance on lunchtime show Loose Women, this time promoting her addition to the cast of The Bill. She also briefly appeared in Emma Bunton's video for her single "Downtown" for Children in Need.  She has been on the TV show This Morning twice.

On 16 May 2007, Lytton first appeared in the ITV1 police drama The Bill as PC Beth Green. She had previously appeared as a different character in a 1997 episode, coincidentally starring alongside actor Billy Murray, who previously played her father in EastEnders. She left the show in March 2009.

On 27 August 2007, Lytton appeared on BBC's Test The Nation and was the top "Celebrity" participant.

She attends numerous charity events and movie premieres throughout the year such as "Children's Champions" in 2007 and 2009 and the "Legends Ball" in 2008.

She was a member of the audience on Happy Birthday Brucie which celebrated TV presenter Bruce Forsyth's 80th birthday in 2008.

Louisa Lytton was chosen as one half of the United Kingdom's entry for the Eurovision Dance Contest 2008, finishing 9th out of 14 countries.

She appeared on GMTV for a third time in March 2009 as well as Loose Women for a third time.

She played Imogen in American Pie Presents: The Book of Love. The seventh instalment from the franchise was released straight to DVD in December 2009.

On 13 July 2009 Lytton went on GMTV to talk about her roles in the Shakespearean plays Much Ado About Nothing and A Midsummer Night's Dream. This interview was conducted with Lorraine Kelly on her segment of the show.

She appeared in FHM December 2009 issue. She gave an interview along with provocative pictures of herself in her bra and panties and lingerie.

On 12 June 2010 she was a guest star on Casualty on BBC1, on which she played goth girl Grace Fielding.

In 2012 she featured in the film The Knot (2012 film) in which she played Stephanie. She also took part in Payback Season where she played Keisha.

In February 2012, she attended the press night for magician Hans Klok's show The Houdini Experience at The Peacock Theatre in London.

In September 2012, she was in the stage show A Broken Rose, playing the lead character Maria.

In 2013 she was in Young High and Dead, in which she played a character called Jenny.

In 2014, she played Michelle in the ITV sitcom series Edge of Heaven.

In 2015 she appeared in a music video for ILL BLU – Give Me ft. Kahlia Bakosi. In the same year, Louisa played Ginny Beasley in an episode of Murdoch Mysteries called Barenaked Ladies.
 
In 2016, Lytton took part in the third series of The Jump. She was the first celebrity to be eliminated on 31 January.

She also played the part of Alva in Fractured, an independent film released in 2016.

Theatre work
In 2001, Lytton was in a musical production of Les Misérables, and played the leading role in the musical, Annie.

Lytton performed in the Peter Pan Pantomime at the Milton Keynes Theatre in 2008, and again at the Deco Theatre, Northampton in 2009. Also in 2009, she joined the British Shakespeare Company to tour the UK and Prague, playing Cobweb (a fairy) in A Midsummer Night's Dream, and Hero in Much Ado About Nothing. Her other theatre credits include playing Debs in the Boogie Nights UK tour (Jan – April 2013), Princess Aurora in the pantomime Sleeping Beauty at the Hazlitt Theatre (2017), and Betty Rizzo in a UK tour of the musical Grease (2017–2018).

Personal life
When she was younger, Lytton dated singer Aston Merrygold. In February 2011, she received a 14-month driving ban and fined £350 after being arrested for drink driving the previous month.

In 2017, Lytton began a relationship with businessman Ben Bhanvra, after the pair met through a mutual friend. The pair got engaged on 7 February 2019, on Lytton's 30th birthday. In March 2021, the couple announced that their first child is due later in the year. Lytton gave birth to a baby girl, Aura Olivia Bhanvra, on 30 August 2021. In April 2022, Lytton returned to work following her maternity leave, by giving a theatrical performance at Theatre Royal, Windsor, where she was praised by many fans and critics alike. On 9 July 2022, Lytton married Bhanvra in a private ceremony in Italy, attended by ninety guests, including EastEnders co-stars James Bye, Lacey Turner, Mohammed George and Zaraah Abrahams.

Filmography

Film

Television

Theatre Credits

Awards and nominations

References

External links

 British Shakespeare Company

1989 births
Living people
English child actresses
English film actresses
English musical theatre actresses
English people of Italian descent
English soap opera actresses
English television actresses
People from Camden Town
Alumni of the Sylvia Young Theatre School
20th-century English actresses
21st-century English actresses